Provincial Trunk Highway 27 (PTH 27, locally known as Parkdale Road) is a very short provincial highway in the Canadian province of Manitoba. It runs from PTH 8 (McPhillips Rd.) to PTH 9 (Main St.). 

Along with PTH 49 and 57, PTH 27 one of the shortest provincial trunk highways within Manitoba. Unlike the other two highways, which are short connector spurs to the same numbered highways in Saskatchewan, PTH 27 serves as a connector between two major highways within the Winnipeg metropolitan area.

The highway is used as a connector to PTH 8 and the St. Andrews Airport from the minor communities along Main St. 

The speed limit is 80 km/h (50 mph).

History
The current PTH 27 has been in existence since 1968. The highway was originally numbered as PTH 8A when it first opened in 1964.

Prior to this, Highway 27, while still a short trunk highway, was located in the southwestern part of the province. It was an unpaved highway which provided access to Rapid City between PTH 10 at Tremaine (this section was known as Highway 26 prior to 1938) and PTH 16 (then known as Highway 4) at Basswood. The highway followed what is now PTH 24 and PR 270. The original length of Highway 27 was 29 km (18 mi).

Highway 27 was shortened to 23 km (14 mi) in 1956 when the section between Tremaine and Rapid City was renumbered to its current PTH 24 designation. The original Highway 27 was decommissioned in its entirety in 1965 and redesignated as PR 270 when the Manitoba Government implemented its secondary road system the following year.

References

External links 
Official Highway Map of Manitoba - Winnipeg

027